Harlee is a given name. Notable people with the name include:

 Harlee Dean (born 1991), English footballer
 Harlee McBride (born 1948), American actress

See also
 Harley (given name)